The 2018 FIVB Volleyball Women's Challenger Cup was the inaugural edition of the FIVB Volleyball Women's Challenger Cup, a new annual women's international volleyball tournament contested by 6 national teams that acts as a qualifier for the FIVB Volleyball Women's Nations League. The tournament was held in Lima, Peru between 20 and 24 June.

Bulgaria won the title, defeating Colombia in the final, and earned the right to participate in the 2019 Nations League replacing the last placed challenger team after the 2018 edition. Puerto Rico defeated Peru in the third place match.

Qualification

Six teams will compete in the tournament.

Pools composition
Teams were seeded following the Serpentine system according to their FIVB World Ranking as of August 2017. FIVB reserved the right to seed the hosts as head of Pool A regardless of the World Ranking. Rankings are shown in brackets except hosts who ranked 26th.

Venue

Preliminary round
Venue:  Coliseo Eduardo Dibos, Lima, Peru
All times are Peru Time (UTC-05:00).

Pool A

|}

|}

Pool B

|}

|}

Final round

Semifinals
|}

3rd place match
|}

Final
|}

Final standing

See also
2018 FIVB Volleyball Women's Nations League
2018 FIVB Volleyball Men's Challenger Cup

References

External links
Fédération Internationale de Volleyball – official website
FIVB Volleyball Challenger Cup  – official website

FIVB Volleyball Women's Challenger Cup
FIVB
2018 in Peruvian women's sport
International volleyball competitions hosted by Peru
June 2018 sports events in South America
Sports competitions in Lima
2010s in Lima